Sin Na-hee (born September 24, 1990 in Daegu) is a South Korean figure skater. She represented her country at the 2008 World Junior Championships and finished 17th. She won the bronze medal at the 2008 Asian Figure Skating Trophy.

Programs

Competitive highlights

References

External links
 
 Sin Na-hee at Tracings.net

1990 births
Living people
South Korean female single skaters
Sportspeople from Daegu
Figure skaters at the 2007 Asian Winter Games
Competitors at the 2009 Winter Universiade
Competitors at the 2011 Winter Universiade